Antonio Emmanuelovich Spadavecchia (born in Odessa on 3 June 1907 – died in Moscow on 7 February 1988) was a Soviet composer of Italian descent. He was awarded National Artist of the RSFSR in 1977.

He was promoted in cultural exchanges with other socialist countries after the Second World War, and his opera, The Gadfly, was the second Russian opera after Eugene Onegin to be performed at the Hanoi Opera in the 1960s.

Recordings
 Daniil Shtoda (tenor) recorded an aria from The Gadfly in a recital for Delos Records in 2005.

References

External links

 Общество Некрополистов. Могила композитора Антонио Спадавеккиа

Soviet people of Italian descent
1907 births
1977 deaths
Musicians from Odesa
Soviet composers
Soviet male composers
People's Artists of the RSFSR
20th-century classical composers
Burials at Kuntsevo Cemetery
Communist Party of the Soviet Union members
Moscow Conservatory alumni